Israeli pita, also known as pitot, Israeli pitta, or simply pita, is the Israeli version of pita flatbread that is commonly served with hummus and other dips, or as a sandwich bread stuffed with sabich, falafel, chicken schnitzel, shawarma, or other fillings. Israeli pita is commonly found in Israel, as well as in the United States, and at restaurants offering Jewish and Israeli cuisine worldwide.

Overview

Israeli pita is different from other flatbread and pitas in several ways. Israeli pita is generally softer, thicker and doughier than other flatbreads, and it always contains a pocket. Israeli pita is generally thicker than other pitas. Many Arab and Greek pitas are not as soft as Israeli pita, and are typically thinner or do not contain a pocket. The pocket of the pita has “thick walls”, which are unique to Israeli pita, and help Israeli pita be sturdy enough for its signature fillings such as sabich, falafel, shawarma and chicken schnitzel, among others.

Serving and use

Israeli pita has a soft, fluffy, texture that has been described as pillowy and is traditionally served fresh from the oven (typically a wood-fired oven similar to a pizza oven). It is best either soon after baking or on the same day, and is served warm.

It is used in a variety of sandwiches, such as falafel, sabich, chicken schnitzel, shawarma, brik, and many more, as well as with a wide array of dips such as hummus, baba ghanoush, muhammara, zhoug, salat turki, ikra or just with olive oil. It is also traditionally served in Israel as part of an Israeli breakfast, as well as with shakshouka or menemen. It is commonly served with eggs for breakfast. It is also sometimes served with cottage cheese.

Popularity

Israeli pita is one of, if not the most, popular breads in Israel. It is an essential part of Israeli cuisine, and can be served for any meal and any occasion, and can be found on the menu at most restaurants, bakeries, market stalls, and food trucks across Israel. As it contains no animal products, it is inherently pareve and can be served with fleishig or milchig meals to comply with kashrut.

In popular culture

In the Israeli comedy series Beauty and the Baker, main character Amos Dahari (played by Aviv Alush) works at his family's Israeli pita bakery in a working-class city outside of Tel Aviv, when he falls in love with celebrity heiress, actress and socialist Noa Hollander (played by Rotem Sela).
Israeli pita is featured prominently in the American documentary film “In Search of Israeli Cuisine on PBS.
Israeli pita is referred to in the name of the 1974 album by the Israeli rock band Kaveret, Poogy in a Pita.

References

See also

Israeli cuisine
Shakshouka
Hummus
Sabich
Falafel
Laffa
Shawarma
Challah

Israeli cuisine
Jewish breads
Jewish cuisine
Flatbreads